Sophia Chikirou (born 3 June 1979) is a French politician who has represented the 6th constituency of Paris in the National Assembly since 22 May 2022. A member of La France Insoumise (FI), she was elected to Parliament in the first round of the 2022 legislative election. Chikirou has also served as a member of the Regional Council of Île-de-France since 2021.

Political career
A native of Bonneville, Haute-Savoie, Chikirou grew up in Scionzier. She joined the Socialist Party in 1997. From 2002 to 2007, Chikirou worked as a parliamentary assistant for Michel Charzat, who represented the 21st constituency of Paris in the National Assembly. She was excluded from the party in 2006 along with Charzat after they refused to rally behind George Pau-Langevin, the party's nominee for 2007 legislative election in the constituency. Charzat ran for reelection as a Socialist dissident under the miscellaneous left label with Chikirou as his substitute but was defeated.

As a member of La France Insoumise since 2016, she was Jean-Luc Mélenchon's presidential campaign communications director in the 2017 election. In the 2022 legislative election, she was elected to Parliament for the 6th constituency of Paris, where she succeeded one-term incumbent Pierre Person of La République En Marche! who declined to run for reelection.

References

Living people
1979 births
People from Haute-Savoie
Politicians from Île-de-France
Pantheon-Sorbonne University alumni
21st-century French women politicians
Members of the Regional Council of Île-de-France
Deputies of the 16th National Assembly of the French Fifth Republic
Members of Parliament for Paris
Socialist Party (France) politicians
Modern Left politicians
Left Party (France) politicians
La France Insoumise politicians